SuperValu is a supermarket chain that operates on the island of Ireland. SuperValu is operated as a symbol group; each store is independently owned, with store owners using the SuperValu format and selling the chain’s own brand products. SuperValu outlets tend to be larger than the convenience shop formats used by many other symbol group retailers such as Centra, Gala and Spar, and the larger SuperValu stores are on a par with full-service supermarkets. Their main competitors are Dunnes Stores and Tesco.

History

The supermarket was founded on  out of the larger outlets in Musgrave's VG chain (originally formed in 1960). The smaller VG stores became Centra. From a base of sixteen stores (mainly in Munster), SuperValu had 182 stores in the Republic of Ireland and 36 stores in Northern Ireland as of 2004. Along the way, Musgrave has pursued a policy of buying stores itself and then re-leasing them to franchisees, acquiring some of the insolvent H Williams stores in 1987, L&N in 1995, and Wellworths (in Northern Ireland) in 1996.

Wellworths-SuperValu was a trading name used briefly by Musgrave in Northern Ireland following its acquisition of small-to-medium Wellworths outlets in 1996. This was to distinguish from larger Wellworths stores which were acquired by Safeway Stores (Ireland), a joint venture between Fitzwilton and Safeway (UK). In due course, the Wellworths name was entirely dropped.

SuperValu previously operated supermarkets in larger Roches Stores locations under the name "SuperValu at Roches Stores" for many years.

Superquinn was bought by the Musgrave Group, parent of SuperValu, in 2011. In August 2013 it was announced that all Superquinn stores would be rebranded to SuperValu with all the existing stores eventually changed to SuperValu by February 2014. As a result, SuperValu became the second-largest supermarket chain in the Republic of Ireland by grocery spend.

See also
Centra
Musgrave Group
List of Irish companies

References

External links
SuperValu.ie

Supermarkets of Northern Ireland
Supermarkets of the Republic of Ireland
Irish brands
1968 establishments in Ireland
Retail companies established in 1968